Johan Jozef Marie Clara Van Hecke (born 2 December 1954 in Ghent) is a Belgian politician and Member of the European Parliament for Flanders with the Vlaamse Liberalen en Democraten, part of the Alliance of Liberals and Democrats for Europe and sits on the European Parliament's Committee on International Trade.

He is also a member of the Delegation to the ACP-EU Joint Parliamentary Assembly and a substitute for the Delegation for relations with South Africa.

He is married to Els De Temmerman, a journalist and activist who established vzw Childsoldiers, an organization that works for the rehabilitation of child soldiers in Africa. He lives in Oosterzele.

Education
 1978: Degree in medical sociology

Career
 1978-1980: Assistant at the faculty of sociology, Catholic University of Louvain
 1980-1983: Head of research department and lecturer at the HIPB (Higher Institute for the Paramedical Professions), Ghent
 1983-1986: National Chairman of the Youth CVP
 1993-1996: General Chairman of the CVP
 1997-1999: Director of EPP training institute in South Africa
 1983-1988: Member of the Oosterzele Municipal Council
 1989-1997: Mayor of Oosterzele
 2001: Member of Ostend Municipal Council
 1985-1997: Member of the House of Representatives
 1991-1993: Leader of the parliamentary CVP, House of Representatives
 since 1999: Member of the European Parliament

See also
 2004 European Parliament election in Belgium

External links
 
 

1954 births
Living people
Open Vlaamse Liberalen en Democraten MEPs
MEPs for Belgium 1999–2004
MEPs for Belgium 2004–2009
Mayors of places in Belgium